The 2006–07 season was the 105th season in the history of Stade Rennais F.C. and the club's 13th consecutive season in the top flight of French football. In addition to the domestic league, Rennes participated in this season's editions of the Coupe de France and the Coupe de la Ligue. The season covered the period from 1 July 2006 to 30 June 2007.

Competitions

Overall record

Ligue 1

League table

Results summary

Results by round

Matches

Source:

Coupe de France

Coupe de la Ligue

References

External links

Stade Rennais F.C. seasons
Rennes